Remix to Rio is a 2010 Canadian documentary depicting young people from Toronto, Canada and Rio de Janeiro, Brazil as they create community outreach projects aimed at rescuing their peers from lives of crime.

Description
This film follows Canada’s innovative youth outreach organization, The Remix Project as they travel to some of the most violent favelas in Rio de Janeiro and test their unique hip-hop outreach model on some of today’s most “unreachable” youth.

Remix Project co-founders Gavin Sheppard and Drex Inkredible join forces with "Sandro", an Ex-drug lord turned activist and Soldiers Never More project founder "Farina" in hopes of constructing a recording studio for disadvantaged youth in the Favela known as “The Enchanted Land” (Tera Encantada).

Gavin and Drex also bring four of their most hopeful students to Rio. The HUTUZ Hip-Hop festival, Latin America’s largest Hip-hop festival, is in full swing and sets the scene for these REMIX participants to test their skills.  The culture shock the Remixers experience and the perspectives they gain change their perspectives on poverty and redefine their personal circumstances at home.

As the hip-hop concert at HUTUZ approaches the Remixers decide to enlist the help of some young drummers from a local music outreach program from the notoriously violent neighborhood of Vila Aliança.  As rehearsals progress an unexpected bond is formed between these little drummers and the Remixers themselves. It is through these enthusiastic new friends that the Remix crew discovers the real challenges and brutal violence facing the youth in Rio today.

The film was Directed and Produced by Ravi Steve Khajuria.

The film features music performed by Remix Project participants.

Spoken languages are English and Brazilian Portuguese with English subtitles.

Screenings
 Indie Spirit Film Festival, Colorado Springs, Colorado, USA 2010
 Flicks- Saskatchewan International Film Festival, Saskatoon, Saskatchewan, Canada 2010
 Viewfinders International Film Festival for Youth, Halifax, Nova Scotia, Canada 2010
 DIY Film Festival, Los Angeles, California, USA 2010

Awards
 Winner- Best Feature Documentary – DIY Film Festival, Los Angeles, California 2010

References

 http://www.remixtorio.com/
 http://www.diyreporter.com/news/news2.asp?news2_id=438

External links
 

2010 films
English-language Canadian films
2010 documentary films
Canadian documentary films
2010s English-language films
2010s Canadian films